Ixtoc-Alfa is a counter-terrorism base created by the Mexican Navy for the purpose of preventing terrorist attacks on the country's Gulf of Mexico oilfields. It was first opened on 22 December 2003. 

The base is located on the Campeche Bank, a coastal shelf off the Yucatán Peninsula.  The base currently has a MI-17 MBT helicopter, 90H Fast patrol Boats. A special group named ASIES also provides security for better coverage and quick response in case of sabotage or if there is an unidentified vessel in the area. The area is permanently patrolled by Sa'ar 4.5 class missile boat navy vessels. Grumman E-2 Hawkeye early-alert planes also add up to the task.

References
 Opera la Armada base antiterrorista on El Universal
  Construye una base antiterrorista en la plataforma petrolera Ixtoc-Alfa on La Jornada
 'Acorazan' plataformas petroleras on El Siglo de Torreón

2003 in Mexico
Military installations of Mexico
Counterterrorism